KFLW is a radio station airing a hot adult contemporary format licensed to St. Robert, Missouri, broadcasting on 98.9 MHz FM. The station serves the areas of Fort Leonard Wood, Missouri, Rolla, Missouri, and Waynesville, Missouri, and is owned by Benne Broadcasting of the Ozarks, LLC.

References

External links

FLW
Hot adult contemporary radio stations in the United States